Roger Robinson is a British writer, musician and performer who lives between England and Trinidad. His book A Portable Paradise (Peepal Tree Press) won the prestigious T. S. Eliot Prize 2019, announced in London in January 2020. He is the second writer of Caribbean heritage to win the prize, the highest value award in UK poetry, after  Derek Walcott who won the 2010 prize. Robinson's victory was also seen as an important one for small presses. A Portable Paradise was only the second book of poetry to win the Ondaatje Prize in May 2020.

Biography
Robinson was born in Hackney, London, to Trinidadian parents, and at the age of four went with them to live in Trinidad, returning to England when he was 19 in the 1980s, He initially lived with his grandmother in Ilford, Essex, before moving to Brixton, an area of south London that he found more congenial. He describes himself as "a British resident with a Trini sensibility". He was chosen by arts organisation Decibel as one of 50 writers who have influenced black-British writing over the past 50 years.

A spoken-word performer in London in the early 1990s, he later performed poetry with bands including Techno Animal, Flytronix, The Bug, Attica Blues and Speeka. Robinson is the lead vocalist for musical crossover project King Midas Sound, whose critically acclaimed debut album Waiting for You was released on Hyperdub Records, becoming number 10 in the top 50 releases of 2009 in Wire Magazine. His solo album of spoken folk, illclectica, was named by Mojo Magazine as "number eight in the top 10 electronic albums for that year. In 2015 he released Dis Side Ah Town, which has been described as "an album that lyrically recalls the most incisive and suggestive lyricists in dub and roots reggae".

Robinson's poetry on the page has won a wide range of plaudits. In 1999 he was one of 30 poets chosen for the influential New Generation Poets collection at the National Portrait Gallery, London. Robinson has toured extensively with the British Council. His one-man shows The Shadow Boxer, Letter from My Father's Brother and Prohibition all premiered at the British Festival of Visual Theatre at Battersea Arts Centre.
Robinson's commissions have included work for the Theatre Royal Stratford East, the National Trust, London Open House, the National Portrait Gallery, LIFT and the Tate. His workshops have been a part of a shortlist for the Gulbenkian Prize for Museums and Galleries and were also a part of the Barbican Centre's Can I Have A Word. In 2010 his poetry collection Suckle won the People's Book Prize. His 2013 collection The Butterfly Hotel was one of three poetry titles shortlisted for the 2014 OCM Bocas Prize for Caribbean Literature.

Robinson's contribution to the poetry community, as well as his own work, has been notable. As well as performing, he has led workshops and lectured on poetry and performance. Until 2000 Robinson was programme co-ordinator of the performance poetry organisation Apples and Snakes. He is a co-founder of London poetry collective Malika's Poetry Kitchen with fellow poets Malika Booker and Jacob-Sam La Rose. Currently run by Jill Abram, the group has fostered some of the UK's most successful poets and is of note for the diversity of its community.

Bibliography
 A Portable Paradise (poetry), Peepal Tree Press, 2019. .
 The Butterfly Hotel (poetry), Peepal Tree Press, 2013. 
 Suckle (poetry), Waterways Series, 2009. 
 Suitcase (poetry), Flipped Eye Publishing, 2005. 
 Adventures in 3D (short fiction), Lubin & Kleyner, 2001.

Albums
 Dog Heart City (Jahtari, 2017)
 Dis Side Ah Town (Jahtari, 2015)
 illclectica (Altered Vibes, 2004)

Awards and recognition 

Ondaatje Prize for "A Portable Paradise" (2020)
T. S. Eliot Prize (2019)

References

External links
 
 Philip Nanton, "Homestyle" (review of Suckle), Caribbean Review of Books, September 2010.
 "The Butterfly Hotel – video by Roger Robinson".

21st-century British male writers
21st-century British poets
Black British writers
British performance artists
British spoken word artists
Living people
People from the London Borough of Hackney
T. S. Eliot Prize winners
Trinidad and Tobago male writers
Trinidad and Tobago poets
Year of birth missing (living people)
Writers from London